Carl Paul Baker (born 26 December 1982) is an English professional footballer who plays as a winger or as an attacking midfielder and was most recently assistant manager for AFC Telford United.

He has made over 450 professional career appearances in the Football League and Conference as well as domestic cup competitions, including 160 appearances for Coventry City.

Born on 26 December 1982 in Prescot, Merseyside, Baker came up through the Liverpool Academy before moving to Prescot Cables. Shortly after, he moved to Southport in 2003, with whom he helped win the Conference North title. An impressive four-year spell saw him earn a move into the Football League with Morecambe, where he found the net 11 times in 48 appearances. Two years at Stockport County followed prior to completing a switch to then-Championship club Coventry City in the summer of 2010. He went on to play 182 times for Steven Pressley's men and was captain for the final two years of his four-year stay. In September 2014, he signed for Milton Keynes Dons, after being released by Coventry. Baker signed for Portsmouth in June 2016. He signed with Indian Super League franchise ATK in the following year but was released without playing in any match due to an injury which ruled him out of the entire season. On 9 March 2018, Carl returned to Coventry City on a short-term deal until the end of the 2017-18 English Football League Two season.

On November 21st 2021, Baker was appointed Assistant Manager at AFC Telford United alongside new First Team Manager Paul Carden.

He has represented England at semi-professional level playing for England C.

Club career
Born in Prescot, Merseyside, Baker started his career with Liverpool at schoolboy level before playing for Prescot Cables. He signed for Southport in 2003.

Southport
Baker's career was forged at Southport. Spotted playing for Prescot by Southport manager Liam Watson, Baker was quickly snapped up by the Merseyside club, and soon established himself as one of non-league's exciting talents. He was an important member of the Southport Conference North Championship winning team in the 2004–05 season. In 2005, he was a member of the Middlesex Wanderers F.C. that visited Japan.

After again playing an important role in helping keep Southport in the Conference National in the 2005–06 season, Baker signed his first full-time contract, for the next season as the club turned fully professional, whilst much of the championship winning, and relegation surviving team, (fan favourites Steve Dickinson, Steve Daly, Earl Davis) all not willing to leave their non-footballing jobs, left unable to make the transition to full-time.

Despite Southport's relegation from the Conference National in the 2006–07 season, Baker swept the board with Player of the Year awards, voted on by his fellow players, the fans and local press. He was a fan favourite with the club's fans, being one of only two players left from the 2005 title winning squad. Although only on a year's contract meaning he could move on for free, the club's official website announced he had signed for another year at the club. This meant that any interested team would have to pay for his services.

Morecambe
On 11 July 2007, he signed for Football League Two newcomers Morecambe for a club record, though undisclosed fee. He signed a three-year contract with Morecambe.
 In August 2007 Baker scored Morecambe's first goal when they beat Football League Championship club Wolverhampton Wanderers 3–1 in extra time in a League Cup match.

In November, Baker was named North West Non-league player of the year, at the North West Football Awards, for his efforts playing for Southport in 2006–07, beating his new Morecambe teammate Adam Yates to the prize.

Stockport County
On 22 July 2008, Baker signed a three-year contract at Stockport County, with the club paying Morecambe a fee that could rise to a figure of £225,000 for his services.

His 2008–09 season was a in-different one for Baker, he played 27 times for County in his first season, scoring 3 goals, all these were before January, when Baker received a knee injury which required surgery.

The 2009–10 season started well for Baker on the pitch and he was seen to be one of Stockport's main assets. By mid-October he was County's leading scorer with 10 goals. Baker became the first County player to score successive away hat-tricks, with stunning performances against Brighton & Hove Albion & Crewe. Baker scored his 10th goal-of-the-season for Stockport from the penalty spot in the game away to Tranmere Rovers, which was live on Sky – dedicating the goal to his brother Mike whose name he bears on his shirt collar.

Baker added to his goals tally by scoring a penalty in the game against Tooting & Mitcham.

On 26 December 2009, Gary Ablett told reporters that Baker has signed a deal with Championship side Coventry City. Baker's last game for Stockport County was against League 1 leaders Leeds United in which he scored a freekick. The goal was his 13th goal of the season.

Coventry City
Coventry confirmed Baker as the club's fourth permanent signing in the January 2010 transfer window on 8 January 2010. Baker joined Coventry for an undisclosed fee, which was confirmed by him in person as being £300,000.
In February 2010, Manager Chris Coleman praised Baker for his impressive performances since joining the club, likening his playing style to that of Sky Blue legend Tommy Hutchinson.
On 10 August 2010, Baker returned to former club Morecambe, in a League Cup First Round tie. Coventry fell to a 2–0 defeat. The Sky Blues made up for their 2010 cup loss to Morecambe by beating them 2–1 in The 2012–13 FA Cup 2nd Round. Baker scored the winning goal curling the ball round Morecambe keeper Barry Roche just 18 seconds into the second half. During his time at the club he became a fan favourite due to his consistently skillful and dedicated performances, and was club captain for more than two years from 2012 to 2014.

Baker had his Coventry City contract cancelled by mutual consent on 1 September 2014.

Milton Keynes Dons

On 26 September 2014, following his release from Coventry City, fellow League One side Milton Keynes Dons announced Baker had signed for the club, and made his debut on 4 October 2014 in a 0–2 away win against Yeovil Town. Baker scored his first goal for his new club on 8 November 2014 in the FA Cup first round 3–4 away win against Port Vale. Baker also scored his first league goal for the club, again against Port Vale a week later in a 1–0 home win.

On 22 April 2015 Baker scored twice in the 3–0 home win against Doncaster Rovers.

On 28 April 2015 at the club's end of season awards ceremony, Baker was named Player of the Year 2014–15, voted for by supporters of the club.

On 3 May 2015 Baker scored on the final day of the 2014–15 League One season in a 5–1 home win against Yeovil Town, achieving promotion with Milton Keynes Dons to the Football League Championship.

Portsmouth
Baker signed a 2-year deal with Portsmouth F.C. in June 2016, having previously worked with manager Paul Cook at Southport. He scored on his debut in a 1–1 draw with Carlisle United on 6 August 2016.

ATK
On 4 September 2017, Baker moved abroad, signing for Indian Super League franchise ATK. After suffering an injury during the pre-season, he was ruled out of play for the entire season. He was subsequently replaced by Ryan Taylor.

Return to Coventry City
On 9 March 2018, Carl returned to Coventry City on a short-term deal. On 4 May 2018, it was announced that Carl had left the club by mutual consent due to injury; during this second spell with the club he was unable to make an appearance.

Nuneaton Borough
On 31 August 2018, Nuneaton Borough announced that Baker had signed for the club. He made his début for Nuneaton Borough in a 1–0 win at Curzon Ashton the following day. He left the club in January 2019.

Brackley Town
After his departure from Nuneaton Borough, Baker joined fellow National League North club Brackley Town. He scored twice on his home debut, against Bradford Park Avenue on 26 January 2019.

Return to Nuneaton

On 30 July 2020, he re-signed for Southern Football League Premier Division side Nuneaton Borough, at the age of 37.

AFC Telford United
On 26 November 2021, he was appointed as assistant manager to Paul Carden at National League North side AFC Telford United and also continued to feature as a player.

International career
In November 2005 Baker was called up to the England C squad, but was recalled by Southport due to an FA Cup replay against Woking. However, he was called up again for a match against Italy on 15 February 2006, which England won 3–1. He played for England C in their 1–0 win over Finland on 1 June 2007.

Personal life
On 21 August 2006, Baker pleaded guilty at North Sefton Magistrates Court to failing to provide a specimen for analysis, after he had been stopped on 13 August by police in Southport, who suspected Baker had been drink driving. Magistrates disqualified him from driving. Baker made a public apology.

In October 2006 he was suspended for a week and fined by Southport for what was described as a "serious breach of club discipline".

On 16 September 2009 it was confirmed that Baker's older brother (Michael) had died of leukaemia; despite that Carl went on to play just two days later and score 2 goals in Stockport's 2–2 draw with Yeovil Town; his other brother has also been diagnosed with leukaemia. At the end of the Yeovil game Carl was presented with a card signed by the travelling Stockport fans.

Career statistics

Honours
Southport
Conference North: 2004–05

Milton Keynes Dons
Football League One runner-up: 2014–15

Portsmouth
EFL League Two: 2016–17

Individual
Coventry City Player of the Year: 2012–13
Football League One Player of the Month: November 2014
Milton Keynes Dons Player of the Year: 2014–15

References

External links
 
 
 Profile at Aylesbury United FC

1982 births
Sportspeople from Prescot
Living people
English footballers
Association football wingers
Liverpool F.C. players
Prescot Cables F.C. players
Southport F.C. players
Morecambe F.C. players
Stockport County F.C. players
Milton Keynes Dons F.C. players
Coventry City F.C. players
Portsmouth F.C. players
ATK (football club) players
Indian Super League players
Nuneaton Borough F.C. players
Brackley Town F.C. players
AFC Telford United players
English Football League players
National League (English football) players
Southern Football League players
England semi-pro international footballers